The Many Moods of Bobby Vinton is a 2-LP collection of previously recorded songs by Bobby Vinton. Each LP consists of ten songs. The first LP consists of songs that refer to colors, while the second LP consists of those that refer to loneliness (exactly like his album Bobby Vinton Sings for Lonely Nights). The track "Oh, Lonesome Me" features Vinton not on vocals but on saxophone.

Track listing

Record One: The Colorful Bobby Vinton

Side One
 Petticoat White (Summer Sky Blue)
 Blue on Blue
 Roses Are Red
 Am I Blue
 Lavender Blue

Side Two
 Bouquet of Roses
 Blue Velvet
 Ramblin' Rose
 Misty Blue
 Two Purple Shadows

Record Two: The Lonely Bobby Vinton

Side One
 Have You Ever Been Lonely (Have You Ever Been Blue?)
 L-O-N-E-L-Y
 I'll Walk Alone
 Mr. Lonely
 Hello Loneliness

Side Two
 Lonely Street
 Oh, Lonesome Me
 Long Lonely Nights
 So Many Lonely Girls
 All Alone Am I

References

1974 compilation albums
Bobby Vinton compilation albums